I Am The Messer is the second studio album by American rock band Killola, released in 2008. The album was "freeleased" as a completely free downloadable album. This was made possible through a digital distribution agreement/partnership with New York/San Francisco-based digilabel True Anthem, and sponsorships with DW Drums, and Skullcandy. The record was offered via an embeddable web 'widget' allowing the free-download mechanism to spread virally throughout the internet. The band offered two previously unavailable bonus tracks to listeners who downloaded the album in its entirety. The bonus tracks became 'unlocked' after the entire album was successfully downloaded.

Track listing
All songs written by Killola

"This Is How The World Ends" – 3:33
"All Of My Idols Are Dead" – 3:00
"Strung Out On Sunshine" – 3:02
"Is This A Love Song?" – 3:30
"The Man From Kilimanjaro (Interlude)" – 1:17
"Personal Graveyard" – 3:29
"Heartrate 160" – 2:41
"Wa Da We Da" – 2:46
"You Can't See Me Because I'm A Stalker" - 3:29
"10,000 Pound Ego" - 2:58

Unlockable Bonus Tracks
Both written by Killola

"Who We Think We Are" - 3:51
"Cracks In The Armor" - 3:44

Personnel
Lisa Rieffel – vocals
Johnny Dunn – bass
Mike Ball – guitar
Danny Grody – drums

Notes
The song  Is This A Love Song was later released with added vocals from French singer Anais. The title of the album comes from a lyric in the song 10,000 Pound Ego.

External links
 Killola MySpace page
 Official website
 "I Am The Messer" free album download page

2008 albums